Happy is a 2015 French feature film directed by Jordan Goldnadel, with Isabel Ryan, Vladimir Perrin, Jordan Goldnadel and Léa Moszkowicz.

The film showed at the 2015 Montréal World Film Festival, where it received great reviews. The film is sold internationally by Wide Management and receives two nominations at the 2016 Prix Henri Langlois (Henri Langlois Awards). The film also integrates the Eye on Films European Label and is released in several countries including the US, the UK, Ireland and South Korea.

Synopsis  
Alessia, a young American photographer, comes to Paris for obscure reasons. There, she meets Florent, a young bourgeois Parisian searching for purpose in his life. For one summer, they will live an intense passion, orchestrated by travels and encounters with strangers.

Cast 
  Jordan Goldnadel as Florent - Rich Frenchman
 Isabel Ryan as Alessia - Texas American
 Vladimir Perrin as Thomas - Waiter
 Léa Moszkowicz as Marion - Childhood friend
 Charlotte Vercoustre as Coralie
 Arthur Jalta as Louis
 Marcel Aloro as Marcel
 Marc de Panda as Marc

Awards 
 2015: Prix du meilleur Film au Festival international de film de Zadar pour Happy  (nommé)
 2015: Sélection officielle au Montréal World Film Festival pour Happy 
 2016: Prix du public au Prix Henri Langlois 2016 pour Happy  (nommé)
 2016: Prix de la jeunesse au Prix Henri Langlois 2016 pour Happy  (nommé)

Notes and references 

2015 films
French comedy-drama films
2010s French films